The Seikō Club ("Fairness and Friendship Club") was a political party in Japan.

History
The party was established in December 1918 as a merger of the Seiwa Club and a group of eight independent members of the National Diet, and was initially an "Independent Group". In March 1919 it was renamed the Seikō Club, by which time it had 33 Diet members. It did poorly in the May 1920 general elections due to a new electoral law that replaced multi-member constituencies with single-member ones. The following month its last four members merged with the Shinseikai's sole member and 20 independent members to form the Kōshin Club.

References

Defunct political parties in Japan
Political parties established in 1918
1918 establishments in Japan
Political parties disestablished in 1920
1920 disestablishments in Japan